Pappyland is an American half-hour children's television series originally written by Jon Nappa. More than 30 half-hour episodes were written by award-winning children's writer, Eric J. Roberts. Award-winning children's author Benette Whitmore wrote 35 episodes and introduced the character, DoodleBug. It was originally broadcast on WCNY-TV in Syracuse, New York and many other PBS stations from May 24, 1993, to September 3, 1999. Thereafter, the show was moved to TLC and began airing new episodes from September 30, 1996, until 1997, with reruns airing until February 21, 2003. The show starred acclaimed cartoonist-artist Michael Cariglio (born in Utica, New York) as Pappy Drew-It, an artist/49er-type character who lived in a magical cabin in a bizarre land with many different creatures and people. More than half of the show was shot on bluescreen.

Format
During each half-hour segment, Pappy and other characters danced, sang, taught life lessons and other children's television fare but the main focus of the show was watching Pappy draw pictures. The camera was positioned directly above his paper and he would carefully explain the purpose of each technique used. The purpose was for children viewers to be able to follow along with Pappy and create the same image as he did. A selection of viewers who sent in their artwork had their drawing shown during the "Hall of Frames" segment near the end of the show and the closing credits. The show was distributed for broadcast on public television by WCNY in Syracuse, New York; it was produced by the non-profit Craftsman & Scribes Creative Workshop and Creative Media Solutions TV, also based in Syracuse, New York. Writer for 35 episodes was Benette Whitmore. Home viewers were asked to mail their drawings to a post office box in Syracuse. Years later, Michael Cariglio hosted Inspiration Station on Smile of a Child TV. Pappyland is now available on DVD.  The series can be viewed on digital streaming device Roku's Family TV channel.

Characters 
 Pappy Drewitt (portrayed by Michael Cariglio) is an artist and host of the series who loves to draw, He was dressed in a hat, suspenders, glasses, a green bandana, yellow shirt, and khaki pants; similar to the appearance of a forty-niner. The theme song suggests that he created Pappyland; although the season 5 episode "Grandpappy's Day for Drawing", which aired in 1997, suggests that Pappy's father or possibly Grandfather, Grandpappy Drewitt who was also played by Cariglio created Pappyland rather than Pappy himself. He lives in Pappyland and has many friends who live there. A running gag in the series was that whenever he coloured the picture he drew earlier in the episode, he would break one of his crayons. This was done so Pappy could teach kids that you don't have to throw away a crayon just because it breaks. On occasion, when he colored in the picture, he also went outside the lines, thus teaching kids that it's all right to go outside the lines when coloring. In the original VHS, he was portrayed as a hillbilly. To get to various places in Pappyland, Pappy makes use of different modes of transportation like the Pappy Pad Express, the Much More Door, the Wishing Wheel, the Pappyscope, and the Color Copter.
 Elmer (performed by Joe Cariglio) is an old, wisecracking, and sometimes grumpy man who sits in a rocking chair in front of Pappy's desk. He tells a lot of jokes to Pappy. He also works at the Pappy Mines. At the beginning and end of mostly every episode, he would shout "Hey, sonny! Don't you know what time it is?", indicating that it was time to say hello to everyone, and that it was time to leave. He smoked a pipe in the original VHS.
 Binky is a talking paintbrush who originally lived in the Brushlands, but later moved to Pappy's cabin. He likes to paint pictures.
 Lily (performed by Marilyn Arnone) is a talking flower who originally lived in a flower field, but later moved to a windowsill in Pappy's cabin. At the beginning of mostly every episode when she lived in the cabin, Pappy would give her some water from a watering can.
 Grandpappy Drewitt is a painting of either Pappy's father or grandfather and Snacker Jack's uncle. He also appeared in the original VHS.
 Belle (performed by Marilyn Arnone) is a talking telephone who lives in Pappy's cabin starting in the third season. She speaks with a southern accent and sometimes delivers news to Pappy, usually when someone is in trouble.
 Color Copter is a sentient biplane/helicopter that would serve as Pappy's modes of transportation alongside the Pappy Pad Express, the Much More Door, the Wishing Wheel, and the Pappyscope. The Color Copter tends to speak in some episodes.
 MailBird (performed by Ted Long) is a bird who was introduced in the show's third season in 1995. He speaks with an English accent and delivers mail and often makes crash landings when doing so. He also works at the LetterLands Post Office. He was very disorganized, but Pappy later helped him get organized.
 Sing-A-Song Sam (portrayed by Michael Curley, born in Syracuse, New York) is a singer and pianist who in most episodes sang a song about the lesson learned in the episode.
 Buddy Bear (performed by Ted Long) is a bear who loves honey. He lives in a cave known as the Hamlet in Pencil Point. Like Pappy, he likes to draw, and would sometimes draw for the home viewers in situations where Pappy encountered a problem he couldn't get out of.
 Chucky Woodchuckles (performed by Chris Grom) is a woodchuck who lives in a wooded area in Pappyland called Woodchuckles Place. He is very friendly but tended to lose things he borrowed from others, such as Pappy's crayons. Pappy taught him about responsibility.
 Tree-O are a group of three trees that lived in a forest. Their names are Oakie, Birchwood and Miss Maple. They didn't appear in later seasons, as they were replaced by Woody.
 Woody is a tree that lived at the entrance of Pappyland. He once thought he had no friends, but Pappy cheered him up by drawing a picture of him. He appeared in the original VHS, and sang the song "Did you ever Wanna be" to Grandpappy. He is the only character besides Pappy, Elmer, and Grandpappy to appear in the actual show, but he didn't appear until later episodes.
 Pumpkin Pop and Pumpkid are father and son pumpkins that originally lived in the Pappyland Grand Garden, but later lived on a cart next to Woody.
 Turtle Lou (performed by Gabriel Velez) is an Italian anthropomorphic turtle who lives in a grass hut by a river on the path to Pencil Point called Turtle Lou's Landing. He likes to fish. He originally appeared to look like a non-anthropomorphized regular turtle and was known as "Turtle Louie"
 Doodle Bug (performed Marilyn Arnone) is a bug who was introduced in the fourth season in 1996. He tries to stump Pappy by doodling something for Pappy to finish. Pappy, however, always wins. In the Season 5 episode "The Day Pappy Forgot How to Draw", Doodle Bug stumped Pappy with a doodle for the first time. After Pappy recovered, Doodle Bug did a different doodle for him and Pappy actually completed it. He and his Doodle family lived in the Doodle Dunes of Pappyland.
 Donkey Dan is a donkey that lives in a stable at the barnyard.
 Duggan is a small parrot who appeared in a few episodes. He is usually unjustifiably angry and sometimes violent towards the other residents of Pappyland. A drawing or soothing talk from Pappy often placates him, but more often he uses it as an excuse to criticize Pappy.
 Fur Bear was a skinny bear who lived in Pappyland in the original VHS during Grandpappy's days. He spent his whole hibernation riding an elephant.
 McBride was a pirate who lived in Birmingham in a bottle in the original VHS. He is currently searching for his pirate captain, Captain Jack.
 Fishface was a mean-spirited fish that Pappy eventually won over with his kindness and drawing. He lived in the lake near Turtle Lou and did appear in later episodes.
 Snacker Jack Drewitt is Pappy's city cousin and Grandpappy's nephew who appeared in the season 4 episode "Snacker Jack and the Snack Attack". At first, all he eats is junk food, but Pappy talks him into eating healthy food.
 Uncle Tony is Turtle Lou's uncle who appeared in the season 6 episode "Turtle Lou visits Italy".
 Wanda is a woodpecker who lived at Woodchuckles Place with Chucky and only appeared in season 2 in 1993.
 Songbirdy is an animated bird who appeared in season 2 in 1993.
 Flutterby is an animated butterfly who appeared in season 2 in 1993.
 Elizabeth Tricase is Buddy Bear's pen pal who is hearing impaired and appeared in the Season 3 episode "Pappy Talks with his Hands".
 Eloise is Elmer's twin sister who appeared in two episodes of season 3 which aired in 1995.
 Color Taker or C.T. for short, is a selfish bully resembling a vacuum cleaner who lived in the Color Mountain and was on the loose to eat all the colors out of Pappyland in the episode "The Day Pappyland Lost Its Color". Pappy did a drawing to show Color Taker that being a bully isn't the best way to get what he wants. Pappy then activated a switch on Color Taker to bring back the colors to Pappyland and the two became friends. Then Pappy flew in his Color-Copter to take Color Taker back to Color Mountain where he could eat all the colors he would want inside the mountain.
 Mya (portrayed by Kali Deleo) is a Pappyland fan with a big imagination who appeared in the Season 6 episode "Pappyland's Mixed Up Day".
 Mrs. Pappy (portrayed by Michele Cariglio Finnerty) is Pappy's wife, imagined by Mya, who appeared in the Season 6 episode "Pappyland's Mixed Up Day".
 Patsy (portrayed by Lori Ann Lesmeister) and Eddie (portrayed by Thomas Rhett Kee) are Hollywood producers who appeared in the Season 6 episode "Hollywood Comes to Pappyland".
 The Pappy Imposters (portrayed by Bill Neer, Patrick Bader and Dennis Calkins) are auditionees who were auditioning for the role of Pappy, appeared in the Season 6 episode "Hollywood Comes to Pappyland".
 Santa Claus (portrayed by J.P. Crangle) appeared in the Christmas special "A Pappyland Christmas".
 Hans and Fritz are Santa's elves who appeared in the Christmas special "A Pappyland Christmas".

Episodes

Season 1 (1993)
Elmer's Birthday Party Mystery- Elmer is nowhere to be found on the day of his surprise birthday party.
Chucky Wins at Having Fun- Turtle Lou teaches Chucky Woodchuckles that there is more to competition than coming in first.
Chucky Learns to Keep Trying- Chucky Woodchuckles gets a lesson in perseverance while learning to read.
Pappy Talks With His Hands- When Buddy Bear's hearing-impaired pen pal visits, he is concerned he won't be able to talk with her.
Donkey Dan Gets a Case of the Jittery Nerves- Donkey Dan learns ways to cope with his nervousness over his inability to dance.
Buddy Bear and Turtle Lou Trade Places- Buddy Bear and Turtle Lou disagree over which path to take for their walk together.
Eloise and Elmer Compliment Each Other- Elmer learns about giving and accepting approval from his visiting sister.
Turtle Lou Gets a Package- Turtle Lou is inattentive to his friends' attempts to tell him about a package that was delivered for him.
Chucky Plants Some Clover- Chucky Woodchuckles lacks the confidence to plant clover around his place.
Turtle Lou and Buddy Bear Play Fair With Chucky- Chucky Woodchuckles wants to play checkers with Buddy Bear and Turtle Lou.
Donkey Dan and Buddy Bear Cook Up An Idea - Donkey Dan and Buddy Bear learn that using your imagination is lots of fun. 
Turtle Lou Minds His Manners- Pappy helps Turtle Lou polish his manners.
Fishface and Turtle Lou Talk Things Through - Fishface and Turtle Lou learn that talking things through helps solve problems. 
The Case of the Lost Watercolor Set- Chucky Woodchuckles loses a watercolor set he borrowed from Mailbird.
I'm Not a Good Enough Artist- Buddy Bear thinks his painting is not as good as everyone else's artwork.

Season 2 (1994)
Pappy's Imaginary Space Adventure- Inspired by a drawing of an alien, the gang takes an imaginary space journey with the cabin as their spaceship.
Did You Ever Want to Be...- A letter from a would-be artist sparks an adventure in which everyone learns to be the best they can be.
Turtle Lou's Lucky Sneakers- Turtle Lou's friends help him to do his best even though he's lost his lucky sneakers before a race.
The Day Pappyland Lost Its Colors- A selfish bully named the Color Taker is on the loose and is sucking all the color out of Pappyland.
Would You Be Woody's Friend?- Woody mistakenly thinks his friends visit him only because they can't avoid him.
Buddy Bear's Bad Dream- Everyone learns to face their fears after a thunderstorm knocks out the lights and Buddy Bear has a bad dream.
Mailbird Gets Organized- Mailbird needs help getting organized after he starts delivering mail to the wrong people.
It's OK to Be Different- Buddy Bear's reluctant to send a picture of himself to his pen pal until he learns it's OK to look different.
The Search for the Secret Treasure- Elmer discovers a treasure map that leads to the secret of creativity.
Pappy's Creative Camping Adventure- Pappy teaches his pals how to open up to the world around them during a camping trip.
Snacker Jack and the Snack Attack- Pappy's cousin, Snacker Jack, learns how his bad eating habits affect his health and his creativity.
Hollywood Comes to Pappyland- Two movie producers try to turn Pappyland into another glitzy Hollywood.
Miss Maple Forgets to Be Nice- Miss Maple learns the importance of kindness after ordering the noisy Flutter-by and Song-Birdie to leave the forest.
A Pappyland Christmas- Everyone awaits Santa at Christmas.
Donkey Dan's Special Visit- Donkey Dan learns a valuable lesson about commitment.
First Things First for Binky- Binky the Brush learns a lesson about setting priorities.
Pumpkid Learns About Trust- Pumpkid is worried that Pumpkin Pop won't keep his word and take him to the Pumpkin Party.

Season 3 (1995)
Pappy's Drawing with Numbers Adventure - Pappy draws things using numbers. 
The Best Doodler in the Land- Doodlebug deluges Pappyland with doodles when he thinks he's been forgotten on Special Awards Day.
The Big Whopper- Someone accidentally breaks a special exhibit on the day of the "Hall of Frames" exhibit.
Trouble at the Pappyland Art Festival - Doodlebug causes havoc at the Pappyland Art Festival and learns a lesson on why it's not a good idea to steal other people's ideas. 
Buddy Bear Learns About Love- Pappy teaches Buddy Bear about the different kinds of love.
Buddy Bear Gets a Honey of a Belly- Buddy Bear learns about nutrition and exercise after getting fat on too much honey.
Oakie Learns to Share- Oakie, Miss Maple and Birchwood argue over who is getting the most sunlight until they learn about sharing.
The Giant Pappy Adventure- Pappy gets a new perspective of Pappyland when he magically becomes a giant.
The Power Pappy Adventure- Pappy arrives at the cabin where Elmer is watching Power Pete.
Buddy Bear Joins the Circus- Buddy Bear has a chance to join the circus but knows he will miss everyone in Pappyland.
Donkey Dan's Goofy Giggles- Pappy catches a case of the giggles from Donkey Dan.

Season 4 (1996)
Pappy's Wild Adventure - Pappy and the gang imagine themselves in the Wild West and learn about preparation by facing the Doodle Dude (played by Doodlebug). 
Pappy's Alphabet Drawing Adventure- Pappy gets a letter from Mailbird which prompts him to teach the children how to draw cartoons from the letters of the alphabet.
The Day Pappy Forgot How to Draw- Pappy shocks everyone when he announces he has forgotten how to draw.
Doodlebug's Music Recital- Doodlebug practices the saxophone for his music recital.
Mailbird's Special Delivery Route - Mailbird learns how to find the best route to deliver the mail. 
Grandpappy's Day for Drawing- Pappy tells the story of when Grandpappy was the Pappy in Pappyland.
Chucky Loses His Toothbrush- Chucky Woodchuckles is upset about losing his toothbrush.
Tree-O's Noisy Forest- Tree-O and friends can't stop talking all at once, so Pappy gets their attention by drawing a picture about the importance of listening and cooperating.

Season 5 (1997)
I'm Not a Turtle, I'm a Rock - Turtle Lou thinks he's a rock, but he's a turtle after all since Pappy tells him that it's okay to be yourself.
A Lesson for Lily - Lily learns about faith. 
Wanda the Woodpecker Won't Forgive Chucky - Wanda the Woodpecker learns about forgiveness. 
Pumpkid Grows Patience- Pumpkin Pop and Pappy teach an impatient Pumpkid about patience and taking one's time to enjoy growing.
Buddy Bear Wakes Up to Work- When Buddy Bear falls asleep while chopping wood, Pappy takes the opportunity to explain the importance of diligence.
Binky Brushes Up His Confidence- Binky the Brush is discouraged because he thinks Pappy's drawings are nicer than his.
Wanda the Woodpecker's Rude Day - Wanda the Woodpecker learns all about obedience after being rude to Pappy. 
Turtle Lou Gives Some Respect - Pappy learns about respect. 
Turtle Lou Comes Out of His Shell - Turtle Lou learns to be brave. 
Forget Me Not Forgets She's Special - Forget Me Not learns that it's okay to be special. 
Donkey Dan's Disorganization- Donkey Dan's disorganization prevents him from fitting inside his stable.
Binky Thinks Through a Picture- After Binky the Brush learns the value of thinking through, he is able to paint a picture he likes.
Fishface Pressures Chucky - Chucky learns to stand up for himself after Fishface dares him to jump in the pond. 
Staying Fit- Pappy teaches Buddy Bear to stay healthy and fit by eating good foods and exercising.

Pap's ArtVentures

A sequel series continuing the character of Pappy and his adventures with his pals and kids on the show.

It debuted on Oct. 22, 2019 on Michael Cariglio's YouTube channel.

References

 Arnone, Marilyn P. (2005). Motivational Design: The Secret to Producing Effective Children's Media. Lanham, MD : Scarecrow Press. 
 Connors, Dennis J. (2006). Crossroads in Time: An Illustrated History of Syracuse. Syracuse, N.Y. : Onondaga Historical Association.

External links
 Pappyland
 Michael Cariglio
 

1990s American children's television series
1993 American television series debuts
1997 American television series endings
American children's education television series
American television shows featuring puppetry
English-language television shows
PBS Kids shows
PBS original programming
Television series about art
TLC (TV network) original programming